Lissanover is a townland in the civil parish of Templeport, County Cavan, Ireland. It lies in the Roman Catholic parish of Templeport and barony of Tullyhaw.

Geography

Its chief geographical features are streams, quarries, gravel pits and a spring well. Lissanover is traversed by a public road, several rural lanes and the disused Cavan and Leitrim Railway. The townland covers 299 statute acres.

Etymology

The supposed derivation of the townland name The Fort of the Pride is given in a book published in 1875 The Origin and History of Irish Names of Places by Patrick Weston Joyce as follows-

Lissanover is the name of a place near the village of Bawnboy, in Cavan. The people there have a tradition that the castle was in former days held by a chieftain named Magauran, who was a merciless tyrant; and they tell that on one occasion he slew a priest on the altar for beginning Mass before he had arrived. This is believed to have given origin to the name Lios an Uabhair, the fort of pride.

A book published in 1912 entitled "Folk Tales of Breffny" by a Templeport author Mrs Augusta Wardell, née Hunt, under the pen name 'Bunda Hunt' gives another version of the tale in which a widow offers a traveler her last mug of milk (as her cow was ordered destroyed by a nearby king) and in return he blesses her with a cow which never ran dry.

History

The earliest surviving mention of the townland name is Lissenovir, which appears in a document dated 28 November 1584 in the Carew Manuscripts. It reads as follows-

 (The word 'towghe' above is an Anglicisation of the Irish "tuath")

The 1938 Dúchas Schools' Folklore Collection describes local legends about Lissanover Castle.

On 19 January 1586 Queen Elizabeth I of England granted a pardon to Edmund m'Brien m'Thomas Magawran, of Lysenower, for fighting against the Queen's forces. He was brother to three successive chiefs of the clan, Brian Óg Mág Samhradháin, Tomas Óg mac Brian Mág Samhradháin and Feidhlimidh Mág Samhradháin.

On 9 June 1602 Queen Elizabeth I of England granted a pardon to Hugh m'Caher O Reyly, of Lysanovor, for fighting against the Queen's forces.

On 12 September 1603 King James VI and I granted a general pardon to Cormock McGawran, a yeoman of Lisinower, for fighting against the King's forces.

The 1609 Baronial Map depicts the townland as Lissenowre.

The 1652 Commonwealth Survey lists the townland as Lissanower.

The 1665 Down Survey map depicts it as Lisinore.

William Petty's 1685 map depicts it as Lismore.

In the Plantation of Ulster by grant dated 4 June 1611, along with other lands, King James VI and I granted the four polls of Lissanover to Bryan McShane O'Reyly.

Bryan McShane O'Reyly then sold the townland to John Chapman. An Inquisition of King Charles I of England held in Belturbet on 12 June 1661 gives a history of the occupation of Lissanore after the sale. It was occupied first by John Chapman and his eldest son Robert (along with other lands in Templeport). By deed dated 29 October 1639 they sold Lessenore to John's youngest son William Chapman for £100. William Chapman died on 1 May 1647. He left the land to his brother Robert who died on 1 August 1649. Robert's wife Elizabeth was still alive in 1661 but he had left the land to his two spinster daughters, Jane and Bridget, who were of full age in 1647. Bridget Chapman died on 1 May 1661. The 1652 Commonwealth Survey lists the townland as belonging to Lieutenant John Blackforde and on 1 May 1659 Jane and Bridget Chapman sold their interest in Lissonoror to said John Blachford for £120. John Blachford was born in 1598 in Ashmore, Dorset, England, the son of Richard and Frances Blachford. He became a merchant in Dorchester, Dorset but fled to France in 1633 when facing a warrant from the Exchequer for not paying customs. He married Mary Renald from Devon and died at Lissanover in 1661 and was buried at St. Orvins in Dublin (probably St. Audoen's Church, Dublin (Church of Ireland)) despite wishing to be buried back in Dorchester. His will was published on 9 January 1665 leaving his son John Blachford as his sole heir. He had sons John, Thomas, Ambrose and William (who became a Major) and daughters Mary and Frances. Major William Blachford was born in 1658 and died at Lissanover on 28 March 1727.

In the Hearth Money Rolls compiled on 29 September 1663 there were three Hearth Tax payers in  Lissenower, John Blatcheford, Peter Rottenberry and William Towse. Blatcheford had two hearths, which indicated a larger house than others in the townland.

On 3 Feb 1699 William Blachford of Lisanover, Templeport was appointed High Sheriff of Cavan

1641 Rebellion

In the Irish Rebellion of 1641 Eleanor Reynolds of Lissanore made a deposition about the rebellion in Lissanover as follows-

.

In the Irish Rebellion of 1641 William Reynolds of Lisnaore made a deposition about the rebellion in Lissanover as follows-

folio 260r

Landowners since 1700

A deed dated 18 June 1724 includes William Blachford and Farrell McKeirnan, both of Lissnover & Lisnover.

A deed dated 10 May 1744 spells the name as Lisnover.

In the Templeport Poll Book of 1761 there was one person registered to vote in Lissanover in the 1761 Irish general election - Thomas Blashford who lived in Ballymagauran but who also had a freehold in Lissanover. He was entitled to two votes. The four election candidates were Charles Coote, 1st Earl of Bellomont and  Lord Newtownbutler (later Brinsley Butler, 2nd Earl of Lanesborough), both of whom were then elected Member of Parliament for Cavan County. The losing candidates were George Montgomery (MP) of Ballyconnell and Barry Maxwell, 1st Earl of Farnham. Blashford voted for Newtownbutler and Coote. Absence from the poll book either meant a resident did not vote or more likely was not a freeholder entitled to vote, which would mean most of the inhabitants of Lissanover.

In the Fermanagh Poll of Electors 1788 there was one Lissanover resident, Robert Hume, who was entitled to vote as he owned land in Lisnaknock townland in Galloon parish.

The 1790 Cavan Carvaghs list spells the name as Lissonover.

In the 1825 Registry of Freeholders for County Cavan there was one freeholder registered in Lissanover- William Blashford. He had no landlord as he owned the fee simple himself. His holding was valued at upwards of £50.

The Tithe Applotment Books for 1826 list four tithepayers in the townland.

In 1833 one person in Lissanover was registered as a keeper of weapons- John Roycroft.

The Ordnance survey Namebooks for 1836 state- There is a gentleman's seat near the centre of the townland with a large orchard garden...it was formerly a place of great repute and the family seat of the Magaurans.

The Lissanover Valuation Office Field books are available for 1839-1841.

Griffith's Valuation of 1857 lists four landholders in the townland.

Census

In the 1901 census of Ireland, there are five families listed in the townland.

In the 1911 census of Ireland, there are eleven families listed in the townland.

Antiquities

 The ruined castle of Lissanover. 
 An earthen ringfort.
 An Iron Age Ring-Barrow or Tumulus. 
 A Late Neolithic or Early Bronze Age Stone circle 
 A Bronze Age Stone row
 A Bronze Age Stone row
 An Early Bronze Age gold lunula was found in Lissanover in 1909 and is now in the National Museum of Ireland.
 Three stone axes were found in the townland
 Lissanover National School. 1862: Eliza Smyth was the headmistress, a Protestant. There were 65 pupils, all Church of Ireland apart from 8 who were Roman Catholic. The Church of England Scriptures, Catechism and Sacred Poetry was taught to the Protestant pupils on weekdays from 2:30pm to 3:30pm and on Saturdays from 12:30 to 1:30pm.

References

External links
The IreAtlas Townland Data Base

Townlands of County Cavan